Grand Prince Yeongchang (12 April 1606 – 19 March 1614, personal name Yi Ui) was a Joseon royal prince as the only legitimate son of King Seonjo, from Queen Inmok who was born when his father was already 55 years old. Due to this, Yeonguijeong Ryu Yeong-gyeong (류영경) once tried to select Yeongchang as the Crown Prince (왕세자, 王世子) to replace his older half-brother, Crown Prince Yi Hon, which eventually caused him to be unjustly executed after Hon's ascension to the throne. People often said that his sad life and death is equivalent to Chang of Goryeo.

Biography

Crown Prince's throne
He become Grand Prince Yeongchang (영창대군, 永昌大君) when he was 6 years old. His father, Seonjo was aware with the fact that Gwanghae had already become the Crown Prince (왕세자, 王世子), then secretly discussed with Yu Yeong-Gyeong (유영경) and some of his servants about censure of the Prince. Seonjo also made plans to change the crown prince when he was born, but it was destroyed. Meanwhile, Seonjo with specifically asked 7 people, including Han Jun-Gyeom (한준겸) to follow the Prince in order to protect him. This was called Yugyochilsin (유교칠신, 遺敎七臣; lit.:"Confucian Chilsin"). Later, when Yi Yi-Cheom (이이첨) and Jeong In-Hong (정인홍) saw this, both of them argued that he shouldn't change the crown prince, but in fact, they went home and spreading unfounded rumors. When Seonjo suddenly died on 16 March 1608, Gwanghae, the Crown Prince took over the throne and then recruited them again.

Later, in 1613, Gyechukoksa (계축옥사) was made and Daebukpa (대북파) made a false confession to Bak Eung-Seo (박응서) and others of the conspiracy to elect the Prince and Kim Je-Nam (김제남), his maternal grandfather. The Prince was then abolished and exiled to Ganghwa-do. From July to November in the same year, Yang-sa (양사), Hongmungwan (홍문관, 弘文館) and Seungjeongwon (승정원, 承政院) alternately impeached them, but Gwanghae rejected they all.

In 1614, Yi Yi-Cheom's group ordered Ganghwabusa (강화부사, 江華府使) to Jeong-hang (정항, 鄭沆) and maliciously burned the Prince's room, also make him quit food. The young prince couldn't sit or lie on a hot floor day and night, grabbed a grate and cried. After this, Yi Yi-Cheom and Jeong-hang reported if the Prince died because of illness. At this time, he was still 7 years old.

Later life
At this time, Samsa (삼사) and Seungjeongwon (승정원) continued to appeal the punishment of Yeongchang.

But, some of Nam-in (남인, 南人), Il-bu (일부) and Seo-in (서인, 西人) opposed his punishment, also Sa-rim (사림) opposed his execution and claimed that although he and Gwanghae were a half brother because their mother was different, there was a righteousness between mother, child, and brothers. In addition, public opinion appeared in favor to him and asked if he would have intention to conspiring against him. However, due to the continued appeals from Daebukpa (대북파), the Prince died in his exile place on 19 March 1614.

After his death, his half big brother, Prince Gyeongchang (경창군)'s 4th son, Prince Changseong (창성군) become his adopted son for continuing the House of Yi Royal Family's line. Then, on 15 March 1623, due to his nephew, King Injo's new reign, he was restored and his title was given back to him.

After life
The Prince's body was transported and buried in 1614 (6th year reign of his half big brother, Gwanghaegun of Joseon) under Namhansanseong in Gwangju-gun, Gyeonggi-do, South Korean and his tomb was located in Goeun-ri, Iljuk-myeon, Anseong-si, Gyeonggi-do firstly, but later relocated in 1993 to Alleyway 4911, Taepyeong 3–dong, Seongnam-si. That tomb was also found damaged in five pieces during the plumbing of a city gas facility.

Legacy
His tomb, "Grand Prince Yeongchang's Mausoleum" (영창대군묘) was designated as the 75th Monument of Gyeonggi-do on 19 September 1983.

Family
 Great-Great-Great-Grandfather
 Deokjong of Joseon (1438 – 2 September 1457) (조선 덕종)
 Great-Great-Great-Grandmother
 Queen Sohye of the Cheongju Han clan (7 October 1437 – 11 May 1504) (소혜왕후 한씨)
 Great-Great-Grandfather
 Seongjong of Joseon (19 August 1457 - 20 January 1494) (조선 성종왕)
 Great-Great-Grandmother 
 Queen Jeonghyeon of the Papyeong Yun clan (21 July 1462 - 13 September 1530) (정현왕후 윤씨)
 Great-Grandfather
 Jungjong of Joseon (16 April 1488 - 29 November 1544) (조선 중종왕)
 Great-Grandmother
 Royal Noble Consort Chang of the Ansan Ahn clan (2 September 1499 - 7 November 1549) (창빈 안씨)
 Grandfather 
 Grand Internal Prince Deokheung (2 April 1530 - 14 June 1559) (덕흥대원군)
 Grandmother 
 Grand Internal Princess Consort Hadong of the Hadong Jeong clan (23 September 1522 - 24 June 1567) (하동부대부인 정씨)
 Father
 Yi Yeon, King Seonjo of Joseon (조선 선조) (26 November 1552 - 16 March 1608)
 Mother 
 Queen Inmok of the Yeonan Kim clan (인목왕후 김씨) (15 December 1584 - 13 August 1632)
 Grandmother - Internal Princess Consort Gwangsan of the Gwangju No clan (1557 - 1637) (광산부부인 광주 노씨)
 Grandfather - Kim Je-nam, Internal Prince Yeonheung (1562 - 1613) (김제남 연흥부원군)
 Siblings 
 Older sister - Princess Jeongmyeong (정명공주) (27 June 1603 - 8 September 1685)
 Brother-in-law - Hong Ju-won, Lord Yeongan (홍주원 영안위) (August 1606 - 3 November 1672)
 Nephew - Hong Tae-Mang (홍태망, 洪台望) (1625 - ?)
 Nephew - Hong Man-Yong (홍만용, 禮曹判書) (1631 - 1692)
 Niece-in-law - Lady Song of the Yeosan Song clan (여산 송씨)
 Grandnephew - Hong Jong-gi (홍중기, 洪重箕)
 Grandniece-in-law - Lady Yi of the Jeonju Yi clan (전주 이씨, 全州 李氏)
 Great-grandnephew - Hong Seok-bo (홍석보, 洪錫輔) (1672 - 1729)
 Great-grandnephew - Hong Hyeon-bo (홍현보, 洪鉉輔)
 Grandnephew - Hong Jong-beom (홍중범, 洪重範)
 Great-grandnephew - Hong Jeong-bo (홍정보, 洪鼎輔)
 Great-grandnephew - Hong Jin-bo (홍진보, 洪晉輔)
 Grandnephew - Hong Jong-yeon (홍중연, 洪重衍)
 Grandniece-in-law - Lady Kim of the Cheongpung Kim clan (청풍 김씨)
 Grandnephew - Hong Jong-bok (홍중복, 洪重福)
 Great-grandnephew - Hong Gyeong-bo (홍경보, 洪鏡輔)
 Grandnephew - Hong Jong-ju (홍중주, 洪重疇)
 Grandniece - Lady Hong of the Pungsan Hong clan (풍산 홍씨, 豊山 洪氏)
 Grandniece - Lady Hong of the Pungsan Hong clan (풍산 홍씨, 豊山 洪氏)
 Grandniece - Lady Hong of the Pungsan Hong clan (풍산 홍씨, 豊山 洪氏)
 Nephew - Hong Man-Hyeong (홍만형, 洪萬衡) (1633 - 1670)
 Niece-in-law - Lady Min of the Yeoheung Min clan (여흥 민씨)
 Grandnephew - Hong Jong-mo (홍중모, 洪重模)
 Great-grandnephew - Hong Yun-bo (홍윤보, 洪允輔)
 Great-grandnephew - Hong Geun-bo (홍근보, 洪謹輔)
 Grandnephew - Hong Jong-hae (홍중해, 洪重楷)
 Great-grandnephew - Hong Yang-bo (홍양보, 洪良輔)
 Nephew - Hong Man-Hui (홍만희, 洪萬熙) (1635 - 1670)
 Niece-in-law - Lady Hwang of the Changwon Hwang clan (창원 황씨)
 Nephew - Hong Tae-Ryang (홍태량, 洪台亮) (1637 - ?)
 Nephew - Hong Tae-Yuk (홍태육, 洪台六) (1639 - ?)
 Niece - Hong Tae-im (홍태임, 洪台妊), Lady Hong of the Pungsan Hong clan (1641 - ?)
 Nephew-in-law - Jo Jeon-Ju (조전주, 曺殿周) (1640 - 1696) from the Changnyeong Jo clan (창녕 조씨)
 Nephew - Hong Man-Hoe (홍만회, 洪萬恢) (1643 - 1709)
 Niece-in-law - Lady Hong of the Namyang Hong clan (남양 홍씨)
 Grandnephew - Hong Jong-seong (홍중성, 洪重聖)
 Unnamed older sister (1604 - 1604)
 Issue
 Adoptive son - Yi Pil, Prince Changseong (창성군 필) (1627 - 1689)

In popular culture
Portrayed by Choi Kang-won in the 1995 KBS2 TV series West Palace.
Portrayed by Kang-san in the 2003 SBS The King's Woman.
Portrayed by Seol Woo-hyung in the 2014–2015 KBS2 TV series The King's Face.
Portrayed by Jeon Jin-seo in the 2015 MBC TV series Splendid Politics.

References

External links
Grand Prince Yeongchang on Naver Page .
Grand Prince Yeongchang on Encykorea .
Grand Prince Yeongchang on Doosan Encyclopedia .

Korean princes
House of Yi
1606 births
1614 deaths
Royalty and nobility who died as children
17th-century Korean people